Vicente Escobedo (born November 6, 1981) is an American professional boxer who competed from 2005 to 2013. As an amateur, he represented his country at the 2003 World Championships and the 2004 Summer Olympics.

Amateur career
As an amateur Escobedo boxed out of the Woodland Boxing Club.

Escobedo represented the United States at the 2004 Summer Olympics, winning one bout and losing one bout. He qualified for the Olympic Games by ending up in first place at the 1st AIBA American 2004 Olympic Qualifying Tournament in Tijuana, Mexico.

Olympic Results 
Jose David Mosquera (Colombia) W TKO 3
Rovshan Huseynov (Azerbaijan) L PTS (18-36)

Amateur Highlights 
Won a gold medal at the 1997 US Junior Olympics at 106 lbs.
Won a bronze medal at 112 lbs at International Junior Olympics tournament in 1997.
Bronze medalist at the 1998 US Junior championships at 119 lbs, losing to Mike Albares.
Competed at the 2000 United States (US) championships at 125 lbs.
2000 P.A.L. National Champion - Won a gold medal at the 2000 Police Athletic League (PAL) Championships at 132 lbs, beating Paul Malignaggi and Marshall Christmas.
Competed at the 2001 US championships at 132 lbs, losing Verquan Kimbrough.
Won a silver medal at the 2001 PAL championships at 132 lbs, losing to Marshall Christmas.
Won a bronze medal at the 2002 US championships at 132 lbs, losing to Lorenzo Reynolds.
2002 P.A.L. National Champion - Won a gold medal at the 2002 PAL championships at 132 lbs, beating Marlon Kerwick, David Rodela and Allen Litzau.
2003 United States Amateur Champion - 132 lbs. - Won a gold medal at the 2003 US championships at 132 lbs beating Aaron Bensinger of the Army World Class Athlete Program a three time National Championship bronze medalist 2002 P.A.L, 2003 National Golden Gloves, and 2004 Western Trials, Karl Dargan and Wes Ferguson.
Competed at the 2003 PAL championships at 132 lbs, losing to Tyrone Harris.
Competed at the 2003 World championships at 132 lbs.
Won a silver medal at the 2004 US championships at 132 lbs, beating Hector Ramos and Mike Torres but losing to Anthony Vasquez.
Won 2004 US Western Olympic trials at 132 lbs beating Sadot Vazquez.
Won 2004 US Olympic trials at 132 lbs beating Miguel Gonzalez, Anthony Peterson, Anthony Vasquez and Peterson again.
Won 2004 US Olympic box-off at 132 lbs, beating Anthony Peterson.
Won a gold medal at the 2004 Titan Games at 60 kg.

Professional career 
Escobedo started off his career with nine straight wins, followed by a loss to Daniel Jimenez. He fought eleven more fights, winning all of them, including wins against former champions Carlos Hernandez and Kevin Kelly. On September 19, 2009, he fought Michael Katsidis for the interim WBO lightweight title, but lost the bout by split decision. On November 6, 2010, he was defeated by Robert Guerrero via unanimous decision, Escobedo was knocked down twice by Guerrero. In 2012 he lost another title fight by TKO in the 5th round to Adrien Broner. On February 16, 2013, Escobedo was knocked out by Edner Cherry in the 6th round. (he was down once in the 2nd round and twice in the 6th). In September 2013 Escobedo suffered his third consecutive loss by KO to Fernando Carcamo, Escobedo was Ko'd in round 2. Overall, he has compiled a record of 25 wins (14 by knockout), and 6 losses.

Professional boxing record 

|- style="margin:0.5em auto; font-size:95%;"
|align="center" colspan=8|26 Wins (15 knockouts, 12 decisions), 5 Losses (2 knockouts, 3 decisions), 0 Draws
|- style="margin:0.5em auto; font-size:95%;"
|align=center style="border-style: none none solid solid; background: #e3e3e3"|Res.
|align=center style="border-style: none none solid solid; background: #e3e3e3"|Record
|align=center style="border-style: none none solid solid; background: #e3e3e3"|Opponent
|align=center style="border-style: none none solid solid; background: #e3e3e3"|Type
|align=center style="border-style: none none solid solid; background: #e3e3e3"|Rd., Time
|align=center style="border-style: none none solid solid; background: #e3e3e3"|Date
|align=center style="border-style: none none solid solid; background: #e3e3e3"|Venue and Location
|align=center style="border-style: none none solid solid; background: #e3e3e3"|Notes
|-align=center
|Loss || 26–5 ||align=left| Edner Cherry
|  ||  ||  || align=left| 
|align=left|
|-align=center
|Loss || 26–4 ||align=left| Adrien Broner
|  ||  ||  || align=left| 
|align=left|
|-align=center
|Win || 26–3 ||align=left| Juan Ruiz
|  ||  ||  || align=left| 
|align=left|
|-align=center
|Win || 25–3 ||align=left| Lonnie Smith
|  ||  ||  || align=left| 
|align=left|
|-align=center
|Win || 24–3 ||align=left| Rocky Juarez
| ||  ||  || align=left| 
|align=left|
|-align=center
|Win || 23–3 ||align=left| Walter Estrada
|  ||  ||  || align=left| 
|align=left|
|-align=center
|Loss || 22–3 ||align=left| Robert Guerrero
| ||  ||  || align=left| 
|align=left|
|-align=center
|Win || 22–2 ||align=left| Carlos Urías
| ||  ||  || align=left| 
|align=left|
|-align=center
|Loss || 21–2 ||align=left| Michael Katsidis
|  ||  ||  || align=left| 
|align=left|
|-align=center
|Win || 21–1 ||align=left| Kevin Kelley
|  ||  ||  || align=left| 
|align=left|
|-align=center
|Win || 20–1 ||align=left| Carlos Hernández
|  ||  ||  || align=left| 
|align=left|
|-align=center
|Win || 19–1 ||align=left| Dominic Salcido
|  ||  ||  || align=left| 
|align=left|
|-align=center
|Win || 18–1 ||align=left| Cristian Favela
|  ||  ||  || align=left| 
|align=left|
|-align=center
|Win || 17–1 ||align=left| Roberto David Arrieta
|  ||  ||  || align=left| 
|align=left|
|-align=center
|Win || 16–1 ||align=left| Pascali Adorno
|  ||  ||  || align=left| 
|align=left|
|-align=center
|Win || 15–1 ||align=left| Miguel Angel Munguia
|  ||  ||  || align=left| 
|align=left|
|-align=center
|Win || 14–1 ||align=left| Carlos Diaz
|  ||  ||  || align=left| 
|align=left|
|-align=center
|Win || 13–1 ||align=left| Priest Smalls
|  ||  ||  || align=left| 
|align=left|
|-align=center
|Win || 12–1 ||align=left| Julian Rodriguez
|  ||  ||  || align=left| 
|align=left|
|-align=center
|Win || 11–1 ||align=left| Ramón Guevara
|  ||  ||  || align=left| 
|align=left|
|-align=center
|Win || 10–1 ||align=left| Baudel Cardenas
|  ||  ||  || align=left| 
|align=left|
|-align=center
|Loss || 9–1 ||align=left| Daniel Jiménez
|  ||  ||  || align=left| 
|align=left|
|-align=center
|Win || 9–0 ||align=left| Jesús Salvador Pérez
|  ||  ||  || align=left| 
|align=left|
|-align=center
|Win || 8–0 ||align=left| Jefferson Auraad Rodríguez
|  ||  ||  || align=left| 
|align=left|
|-align=center
|Win || 7–0 ||align=left| Gregory Piper
|  ||  ||  || align=left| 
|align=left|
|-align=center
|Win || 6–0 ||align=left| Juan Manuel Matias
|  ||  ||  || align=left| 
|align=left|
|-align=center
|Win || 5–0 ||align=left| Edgar Fabian Vargas
|  ||  ||  || align=left| 
|align=left|
|-align=center
|Win || 4–0 ||align=left| Oscar Villa
|  ||  ||  || align=left| 
|align=left|
|-align=center
|Win || 3–0 ||align=left| Geronimo Hernandez
|  ||  ||  || align=left| 
|align=left|
|-align=center
|Win || 2–0 ||align=left| Jose Rodriguez
|  ||  ||  || align=left| 
|align=left|
|-align=center
|Win || 1–0 ||align=left| Abraham Verdugo
|  ||  ||  || align=left| 
|align=left|

Media 
Escobedo made an appearance as himself in Fight Night Round 3. He was also featured in the 4th episode of Discovery Channel's Fight Quest, while training in Ignacio "Nacho" Beristáin's gym in Mexico City.

Personal life 
Escobedo currently works as a boxing coach at Classic Kickboxing in Downtown Pasadena.

He is of Mexican descent.

References

1981 births
Living people
Boxers from California
Lightweight boxers
Olympic boxers of the United States
Boxers at the 2004 Summer Olympics
American boxers of Mexican descent
People from Woodland, California
American male boxers